Kingsweston was a ward of the city of Bristol. The three districts in the ward wer Coombe Dingle, Lawrence Weston and Sea Mills.  The ward takes its name from the old district of Kings Weston (usually spelt in two words), now generally considered part of Lawrence Weston. Following a Local Government Boundary Commission review in 2015 ward boundaries were redrawn and Kingsweston ward is now split between the Stoke Bishop ward and the Avonmouth and Lawrence Weston ward.

Coombe Dingle

Coombe Dingle is a suburb of Bristol, centred on where the River Trym emerges from a gorge passing through the Blaise Castle Estate. A desirable area, the private housing was mainly built in the 1920s and 1930s. Further downstream is Sea Mills.
There was a tin Methodist church which was demolished in the mid-1990s. There are still some photos of it on tin Tabernacles. It was a small gothic building of the 1890s.

Lawrence Weston

Lawrence Weston is a post war housing estate in north west Bristol between Henbury and Shirehampton. It is bounded in the east by the Blaise Castle estate and woods. It is situated directly beneath the wooded Kingsweston Hill. The industrial complex and port of Avonmouth is a mile or so away, across the flood plain. The residential area was built in the late 1940s/early 1950s. Originally council owned, much of the housing stock is now in private hands. It is known as "El Dub" to its inhabitants. The row of shops in Ridingleaze has been revamped and each shop is now adorned with a mural.

Lawrence Weston is well known locally for its vibrant facilities for young people. There are two youth centres, a BMX track, a young people's shop called Juicy Blitz and a Youth Inclusion project. it has the community farm and a range of clubs and groups for young people.

Kings Weston 
Kings Weston formally Weston Regis was originally a hamlet (or tything) in the parish of Henbury, to the west of Lawrence Weston, subsumed into Lawrence Weston when the estate was built in the 1940s.  Historically it was known as the location of Kings Weston House.  The village also gave its name to Kingsweston Hill and Kings Weston Lane, the main road between Lawrence Weston and Shirehampton.

There is a Roman villa at Kings Weston.

Sea Mills

Sea Mills is a suburb of the English port city of Bristol. It is situated some 3.5 miles (6 km) north-west of the city centre, at the seaward end of the Avon Gorge. Nearby suburbs are Shirehampton, Sneyd Park, Combe Dingle and Stoke Bishop.

Sea Mills was the site of a Roman settlement, known as Portus Abonae. The name and location suggest that this was a river port, but to date there has been no archaeological proof of this. The Roman settlement seems to have been abandoned by the 4th century, and there is no evidence of Saxon settlement.

By the Middle Ages Bristol had become a major port, with all traffic between the port and the sea having to pass through the Avon Gorge and past Sea Mills. In 1712, Joshua Franklin, a Bristol merchant, built a wet dock at Sea Mills, to eliminate the need for large sailing ships to navigate the dangerous River Avon any further upstream. This was located where the River Trym enters the River Avon. However, poor transport links doomed the enterprise and the harbour facilities fell into disrepair by the end of the 18th century. Some remains of the dock still exist, and are used as a harbour by pleasure craft.

In the 1920s and 30s, Sea Mills was developed as a planned green suburb. Much of the housing was local council, although it is now mainly in private ownership. Adjacent to the Portway is a small estate of prefabricated bungalows dating from a post-WW2 housing scheme.

The wide A4 Portway trunk road passes along the south-west edge of Sea Mills and links central Bristol with its outport at Avonmouth. Running parallel to the serpentine path of the River Avon, the Portway was the most expensive road in Britain when it was opened in 1926. Both the Portway and the railway line have bridges over the harbour outfall into the Avon.

Ocean-going ships used to sail past Sea Mills, going to and from Bristol City Docks. Nowadays most of the shipping is in the form of pleasure craft, Bristol's main docks now being at Avonmouth and Portbury.

October 2006 saw the opening of The Portway Rugby Development Centre. The facilities it has are 2 outdoor 3G Crumb pitches, suitable for Rugby and Football. Outdoor grass Rugby pitches (ready for August 2007). There are 2 meeting room's and they host many aerobics classes.

Population
According to the 2001 Census there are 10,844 people living in Kingsweston ward, over 95% of whom were white.

Transport
Kingsweston ward is served by 1 railway station, at Sea Mills, just outside the ward boundary. With hourly services between Bristol Temple Meads and Avonmouth, there are also peak connections to Severn Beach.

Bus services serving the area are 3, 4, 10, 11 and 13.

See also
Districts of Bristol
Public transport in Bristol

References

External links

 
 Sea Mills history

Areas of Bristol
Wards of Bristol